Callithump is a solo album by pianist Uri Caine which was released in February 2014 on the Winter & Winter label.

Reception

Writing for The Sydney Morning Herald, John Shand observed "the American prefers to remind us of the wonder of the piano being equally capable of a delicacy so diaphanous that it rivals a harp. Meanwhile its phenomenal range and harmonic and dynamic potential make it the solo instrument par excellence... This direct-to-two-track analogue recording captures all the dynamism of his solo playing. It seduces with what ABC Classic FM would call "swoon" music, dazzles with invention and bullies with 88-note cyclones".  PopMatters' Will Layman stated "Callithump is both atypically normal and classic Caine... the stylistic range and sense of genre is massive, all-engulfing. And fantastic... Ultimately, you come to the end of Callithump exhilarated with the possibilities of a piano, a man, a space".

Track listing
All compositions by Uri Caine
 "Callithump" - 3:35  
 "Sepharad" - 7:02  
 "Map of the Heart" - 4:30  
 "Greasy" - 4:25  
 "The Magic of Her Nearness" - 6:15  
 "Chanson de Johnson" - 3:27  
 "Bow Bridge" - 4:12  
 "Everything Is Bullshit" - 3:54  
 "Raindrop Prelude" - 5:28  
 "Perving Berlin" - 5:33  
 "Dotted Eyes" - 4:48

Personnel
Uri Caine - piano

References

2014 albums
Solo piano jazz albums
Uri Caine albums
Winter & Winter Records albums